Franklin Langham (born May 8, 1968) is an American professional golfer.

Langham was born in Thomson, Georgia. He played golf at the University of Georgia from 1989 to 1991 and was named an All-American in 1991. He played on the 1991 Walker Cup team. 

Langham played on the PGA Tour in 1996, 1998-2002 and 2005 and on the Nationwide Tour in 1993-95, 1997, 2003–04 and 2006–08. He has three victories on the Nationwide Tour and has had finished runner-up on four occasions in PGA Tour events. He best finish on the PGA Tour money list was 26th in 2000. His best finish at a major was 7th place at the 2000 PGA Championship.

The 2008 season saw Langham's final year on the Nationwide Tour.

Professional wins (5)

Nationwide Tour wins (3)

Nationwide Tour playoff record (1–3)

Other wins (2)
1989 Georgia Open (as an amateur)
1992 Georgia Open

Results in major championships

CUT = missed the half-way cut
"T" = Tied
Note: Langham never played in The Open Championship.

Results in The Players Championship

CUT = missed the halfway cut
"T" indicates a tie for a place

Results in World Golf Championships

1Cancelled due to 9/11

QF, R16, R32, R64 = Round in which player lost in match play
"T" = Tied
NT = No tournament

U.S. national team appearances
Amateur
Walker Cup: 1991 (winners)

See also
1995 Nike Tour graduates
1997 PGA Tour Qualifying School graduates
2004 Nationwide Tour Graduates

References

External links

American male golfers
Georgia Bulldogs men's golfers
PGA Tour golfers
Korn Ferry Tour graduates
Golfers from Georgia (U.S. state)
People from Thomson, Georgia
1968 births
Living people